Bob Birdsell (born December 10, 1947) is a Canadian former professional ice hockey player. He was selected by the Detroit Red Wings in the second round (eighth overall) of the 1965 NHL Amateur Draft.

Birdsell played with the Canadian National Team before beginning his professional career in 1969 with the Salt Lake Golden Eagles of the Western Hockey League. He also played the 1970–71 season in the Central Hockey League with the Kansas City Blues and Amarillo Wranglers, and then played two seasons with the Hershey Bears of the American Hockey League before retiring following the  1972–73 season.

References

External links

Living people
1947 births
Amarillo Wranglers players
Canadian ice hockey right wingers
Detroit Red Wings draft picks
Hershey Bears players
Kansas City Blues players